Futureproof may refer to:

Future proof, the process of anticipating future developments and events in the development of a product or system
Futureproof (album), a 1999 album by Pitch Black
Futureproof (novel), 2006 novel by N. Frank Daniels
Futureproof (band), an act from the fourth series of The X Factor
"Futureproof", a 2021 song by Nothing but Thieves